Titanium disulfide is an inorganic compound with the formula TiS2. A golden yellow solid with high electrical conductivity, it belongs to a group of compounds called transition metal dichalcogenides, which consist of the stoichiometry ME2.  TiS2 has been employed as a cathode material in rechargeable batteries.

Structure
With a layered structure, TiS2 adopts a hexagonal close packed (hcp) structure, analogous to cadmium iodide (CdI2). In this motif, half of the octahedral holes are filled with a "cation", in this case Ti4+.  Each Ti centre is surrounded by six sulfide ligands in an octahedral structure.  Each sulfide is connected to three Ti centres, the geometry at S being pyramidal.  Several metal dichalcogenides adopt similar structures, but some, notably MoS2, do not.  The layers of TiS2 consist of covalent Ti-S bonds.  The individual layers of TiS2 are bound together by van der Waals forces, which are relatively weak intermolecular forces.  It crystallises in the space group Pm1.  The Ti-S bond lengths are 2.423 Å.

Intercalation

The single most useful and most studied property of TiS2 is its ability to undergo intercalation upon treatment with electropositive elements. The process is a redox reaction, illustrated in the case of lithium:
TiS2  +  Li  →   LiTiS2
LiTiS2 is generally described as Li+[TiS2−].  During the intercalation and deintercalation, a range of stoichimetries are produced with the general formul LixTiS2 (x < 1).  During intercalation, the interlayer spacing expands (the lattice "swells") and the electrical conductivity of the material increases. Intercalation is facilitated because of the weakness of the interlayer forces as well as the susceptibility of the Ti(IV) centers toward reduction.   Intercalation can be conducted by combining a suspension of the disulfide material and a solution of the alkali metal in anhydrous ammonia.  Alternatively solid TiS2 reacts with the alkali metal upon heating.

The Rigid-Band Model (RBM), which assumes that electronic band structure does not change with intercalation, describes changes in the electronic properties upon intercalation.

Deintercalation is the opposite of intercalation; the cations diffuse out from between the layers.  This process is associated with recharging a Li/TiS2 battery.  Intercalation and deintercalation can be monitored by cyclic voltammetry.  The microstructure of the titanium disulfide greatly affects the intercalation and deintercalation kinetics. Titanium disulfide nanotubes have a higher uptake and discharge capacity than the polycrystalline structure. The higher surface area of the nanotubes is postulated to provide more binding sites for the anode ions than the polycrystalline structure.

Material properties
Formally containing the d0 ion Ti4+ and closed shell dianion S2−, TiS2 is essentially diamagnetic.  Its magnetic susceptibility is 9 x 10−6 emu/mol, the value being sensitive to stoichiometry. Titanium disulfide is a semimetal, meaning there is small overlap of the conduction band and valence band.

High pressure properties
The properties of titanium disulfide powder have been studied by high pressure synchrotron x-ray diffraction (XRD) at room temperature. At ambient pressure, TiS2 behaves as semiconductor while at high pressures of 8 GPa the material behaves as a semimetal. At 15 GPa, the transport properties change. There is no significant change in the density of states at the Fermi level up to 20 GPa and phase change does not occur until 20.7 GPa.  A change in the structure of TiS2 was observed at a pressure of 26.3 GPa, although the new structure of the high pressure phase has not been determined.

The unit cell of titanium disulfide is 3.407 by 5.695 angstroms. The size of the unit cell decreased at 17.8 GPa. The decrease in unit cell size was greater than was observed for  MoS2 and WS2, indicating that titanium disulfide is softer and more compressible. The compression behavior of titanium disulfide is anisotropic. The axis parallel to S-Ti-S layers (c-axis) is more compressible than the axis perpendicular to S-Ti-S layers (a-axis) because of weak van der waals forces keeping S and Ti atoms together. At 17.8 GPa, the c-axis is compressed by 9.5% and the a-axis is compressed by 4%.  The longitudinal sound velocity is 5284 m/s in the plane parallel to S-Ti-S layers. The longitudinal sound velocity perpendicular to the layers is 4383 m/s.

Synthesis
Titanium disulfide is prepared by the reaction of the elements around 500 °C.
Ti  +  2 S   →   TiS2

It can be more easily synthesized from titanium tetrachloride, but this product is typically less pure than that obtained from the elements.
TiCl4  +  2 H2S   →   TiS2  +  4 HCl
This route has been applied to the formation of TiS2 films by chemical vapor deposition.  Thiols and organic disulfides can be employed in place of hydrogen sulfide.

A variety of other titanium sulfides are known.

Chemical properties of TiS2
Samples of TiS2 are unstable in air.  Upon heating, the solid undergoes oxidation to titanium dioxide:
TiS2  +  O2   →   TiO2  +  2 S
TiS2 is also sensitive to water:
TiS2  +  2H2O   →   TiO2  +  2 H2S

Upon heating, TiS2 releases sulfur, forming the titanium(III) derivative:
2 TiS2   →   Ti2S3  +  S

Sol-gel synthesis
Thin films of TiS2 have been prepared by the sol-gel process from titanium isopropoxide (Ti(OPri)4) followed by spin coating. This method affords amorphous material that crystallised at high temperatures to hexagonal TiS2, which crystallization orientations in the [001], [100], and [001] directions. Because of their high surface area, such films are attractive for battery applications.

Unusual morphologoes of TiS2
More specialized morphologies—nanotubes, nanoclusters, whiskers, nanodisks, thin films, fullerenes—are prepared by combining the standard reagents, often TiCl4 in unusual ways. For example, flower-like morphologies were obtain by treating a solution of sulfur in 1-octadecene with titanium tetrachloride.

Fullerene-like materials
A form of TiS2 with a fullerene-like structure has been prepared using the TiCl4/H2S method. The resulting spherical structures have diameters between 30 and 80 nm. Owing to their spherical shape, these fullerenes exhibit reduced friction coefficient and wear, which may prove useful in various applications.

Nanotubes
Nanotubes of TiS2 can be synthesized using a variation of the TiCl4/H2S route. According to transmission electron microscopy (TEM), these tubes have an outer diameter of 20 nm and an inner diameter of 10 nm. The average length of the nanotubes was 2-5 µm and the nanotubes were proven to be hollow. TiS2 nanotubes with open ended tips are reported to store up to 2.5 weight percent hydrogen at 25 °C and 4 MPa hydrogen gas pressure. Absorption and desorption rates are fast, which is an attractive for hydrogen storage. The hydrogen atoms are postulated to bind to sulfur.

Nanoclusters and nanodisks
Nanoclusters, or quantum dots of TiS2 have distinctive electronic and chemical properties due to quantum confinement and very large surface to volume ratios. Nanoclusters can be synthesized using micelle. The nanoclusters are prepared from a solution of TiCl4 in tridodecylmethyl ammonium iodide (TDAI), which served as the inverse micelle structure and seeded the growth of nanoclusters in the same general reaction as nanotubes. Nucleation only occurs inside the micelle cage due to the insolubility of the charged species in the continuous medium, which is generally a low dielectric constant inert oil. Like the bulk material, nanocluster-form of TiS2 is a hexagonal layered structure. . Quantum confinement creates well separated electronic states and increases the band gap more than 1 eV in comparison to the bulk material. A spectroscopic comparison shows a large blueshift for the quantum dots of 0.85 eV.

Nanodisks of TiS2 arise by treating TiCl4 with sulfur in oleylamine.

Applications
 
The promise of titanium disulfide as a cathode material in rechargeable batteries was described in 1973 by M. Stanley Whittingham. The Group IV and V dichalcogenides attracted attention for their high electrical conductivities. The originally described battery used a lithium anode and a titanium disulfide cathode. This battery had high energy density and the diffusion of lithium ions into the titanium disulfide cathode was reversible, making the battery rechargeable. Titanium disulfide was chosen because it is the lightest and cheapest chalcogenide. Titanium disulfide also has the fastest rate of lithium ion diffusion into the crystal lattice.  The main problem was degradation of the cathode after multiple recycles.  This reversible intercalation process allows the battery to be rechargeable. Additionally, titanium disulfide is the lightest and the cheapest of all group IV and V layered dichalcogenides. In the 1990s, titanium disulfide was replaced by other cathode materials (manganese and cobalt oxides) in most rechargeable batteries.

The use of TiS2 cathodes remains of interest for use in solid-state lithium batteries, e.g., for hybrid electric vehicles and plug-in electric vehicles.

In contrast to the all-solid state batteries, most lithium batteries employ liquid electrolytes, which pose safety issues due to their flammability.  Many different solid electrolytes have been proposed to replace these hazardous liquid electrolytes. For most solid-state batteries, high interfacial resistance lowers the reversibility of the intercalation process, shortening the life cycle.  These undesirable interfacial effects are less problematic for TiS2.  One all-solid-state lithium battery exhibited a power density of 1000 W/kg over 50 cycles with a maximum power density of 1500 W/kg.  Additionally, the average capacity of the battery decreased by less than 10% over 50 cycles. Although titanium disulfide has high electrical conductivity, high energy density, and high power, its discharge voltage is relatively low compared to other lithium batteries where the cathodes have higher reduction potentials.

Notes

Further reading
http://authors.library.caltech.edu/5456/1/hrst.mit.edu/hrs/materials/public/Titanium_disulfide.htm

Sulfides
Titanium(IV) compounds
Transition metal dichalcogenides